Magnus Gustav von Essen (Ivan Nikolaevich Essen) was a Baltic German lieutenant general and military governor of Riga at the start of the Patriotic War of 1812.

Life

Pre-1812
From the Essen family in Estonia, from 1783 to 1785 he fought in Poland, where he was seriously injured. He fought in the Russo-Swedish War (1788–1790) as well as Russia's 1792 and 1794 Polish campaigns. For his service at the Battle of Maciejowice he was awarded the 4th degree of the Order of St George.

In 1799 he commanded the first division in the Anglo-Russian invasion of Holland under the command of general Johann Hermann von Fersen. From 1802 he was the military governor of Smolensk. He then fought in the 1807 war against Napoleon, being seriously wounded at Friedland.

1812

During the Patriotic War of 1812 he served as Military Governor of Riga in place of Dimitri Lobanov-Rostovsky and was forced to set fire to Riga's suburbs as soon as the enemy captured their outermost edge. After unsuccessful attempts to stop the Prussians at a distance from the city and unsuccessfully fighting to save Iecava, he ordered the burning of the suburbs but because of a strong wind the fire got out of control and thousands of city residents were left homeless.

Towards autumn the war changed direction. The Prussian corps became overextended, Macdonald remained inactive, a Russian successes was won by Peter Wittgenstein at Polotsk, Napoleon began a general retreat and Fabian Steinheil arrived in Riga - all these circumstances brought Essen to the top of the pile, but due to mismanagement the Russians were unable to capitalise on these victories and suffered heavy losses in several battles. In October Essen was replaced in his post by General Paulucci and filed his resignation.

Essen then went for a long course of treatment at the Baldone sulphur baths near Riga, where he drowned on 23 August 1813 while swimming. According to one version of events, he committed suicide on the anniversary of the firing of the Riga suburbs.

Family
His father was Claus Gustav von Essen, a statesman, and his mother was Magdalena Elisabeth von Stackelberg. Essen married Margaretha von Stackelberg in 1796, they had a daughter, Elisabeth Anna Dorothea, who was married to the Russian general Carl Magnus von der Pahlen (ru).

In fiction

He is portrayed in The Commodore, novel of the Horatio Hornblower series.

Notes

Sources
 Dictionary of Russian generals, members of hostilities against the army of Napoleon Bonaparte in the 1812-1815 war. / / The Russian archive: Sat. — М .: студия «ТРИТЭ» Н.Михалкова, 1996. - M.: Studio «TRITE» N. Mikhalkov, 1996. — Т. VII. - Vol VII. — С. 630-631. - S. 630-631.

1759 births
1813 deaths
People from Viru-Nigula Parish
People from Kreis Wierland
Baltic-German people
Imperial Russian Army generals
Russian commanders of the Napoleonic Wars
Russian people of the Kościuszko Uprising
Russian people of the Polish–Russian War of 1792
French invasion of Russia
Deaths by drowning
Essen family